This is a list of historic places in Kings County, Nova Scotia.

List of historic places

See also 

 List of historic places in Nova Scotia
 List of National Historic Sites of Canada in Nova Scotia
 Heritage Property Act (Nova Scotia)

Kings